Cecil C. Crowley (August 31, 1908 – July 31, 1991) was an American college basketball coach. He was the head coach of the Louisiana Tech Bulldogs basketball program from 1940–1942 and 1945–1964. Crowley was a native of Corsicana, Texas and a graduate of North Dallas High School. He played football and basketball at Centenary College of Louisiana. In 1931, he began his coaching career as an assistant football coach at Haynesville High School.

Among players coached at Louisiana Tech by Crowley were Jackie Moreland and Ray Germany.

Head coaching record

References

1908 births
1991 deaths
American men's basketball players
Basketball coaches from Texas
Basketball players from Texas
Centenary Gentlemen football players
Centenary Gentlemen basketball players
Louisiana Tech Bulldogs football coaches
Louisiana Tech Bulldogs basketball coaches
People from Corsicana, Texas
United States Navy personnel of World War II